Dennis Iverson (born 17 January 1981 in Darwin, Northern Territory) is an Australian judoka, who played for the lightweight category. Started out his sporting career at age twelve, Iverson had earned a total of five titles in the same weight division (2004, 2005, 2008, 2009, and 2010) at the Australian Judo Championships.

Iverson represented Australia at the 2008 Summer Olympics in Beijing, where he competed for the men's lightweight class (73 kg). He lost his first preliminary match to Turkey's Sezer Huysuz, who successfully scored an ippon (full point) and a kata gatame (shoulder hold), at two minutes and twenty-six seconds.

References

External links
Profile – Australian Olympic Team

NBC Olympics Profile

Australian male judoka
1981 births
Living people
Olympic judoka of Australia
Judoka at the 2008 Summer Olympics
People from Darwin, Northern Territory